Loe or LOE may refer to:

 Level of effort
 Levels of evidence
 Living on Earth, weekly news program distributed by Public Radio International
 Loe of Maui, semi-legendary king of Maui
 Loe, Estonia, a village in Estonia
 Loei Airport, IATA code
 Loss of exclusivity, pharmaceuticals going off-patent
 The Loe, Cornwall, UK

People with the surname
Erlend Loe (born 1969), Norwegian novelist
Kameron Loe (born 1981), American baseball pitcher
Raoul Cedric Loe, French footballer